
Year 878 (DCCCLXXVIII) was a common year starting on Wednesday (link will display the full calendar) of the Julian calendar.

Events 
 By place 
 Britain 
 January 6 – King Alfred the Great is surprised by a Viking attack at Chippenham. He is forced to flee, with his retinue, into the Somerset Levels for safety. From his headquarters at Athelney, Alfred wages a guerrilla war against the Vikings.
 May – Battle of Edington: Supported by all the levies of Somerset, Wiltshire and Hampshire, Alfred the Great decisively defeats the main body of Danish Vikings, led by King Guthrum, at present-day Edington (near Bratton Castle).
 Treaty of Wedmore: Guthrum agrees to a peace treaty and is baptised, taking the name of Aethelstan. England is divided between Wessex in the south, and the Vikings in the Danelaw up north. Guthrum returns to East Anglia.
 Battle of Cynwit: Viking raiders, led by Ubba Ragnarsson, land on the coast at Combwich with 23 ships, and besiege a hillfort (called Cynwit) at Cannington. Ealdorman Odda launches a surprise attack, and kills Ubba in battle.
 King Rhodri the Great of Gwynedd, Powys and Seisyllwg, returns to his kingdoms, but is killed fighting the Mercians of King Ceolwulf II. His kingdoms are divided amongst his three sons: Anarawd, Merfyn and Cadell. 
 King Áed I of Scotland is killed in battle, by his rival Giric mac Dúngal. Giric becomes king of the Picts, and allies himself with Eochaid (grandson of Kenneth I). The two rule all of Alba (Scotland) together as joint-kings.

 Arabian Empire 
 May 21 – Siege of Syracuse: The Aghlabids capture the Byzantine fortress city of Syracuse, after a nine-month siege. Most of the population is massacred by the Arabs.
 Zanj Rebellion: The Zanj (black slaves from East Africa) in Mesopotamia seize Wasit (modern Iraq), and establish a presence in the Persian province of Khuzestan.
 King Alfonso III of Asturias conquers the city of Coimbra (modern Portugal), which is under Umayyad reign.

 By topic 
 Religion 
 April 16 – The city of Belgrade is first mentioned in a papal letter to Boris I, ruler (khan) of the Bulgarian Empire.
 September 7 - Pope John VIII crowns Louis the Stammerer as king of the West Frankish Kingdom, in the cathedral at Troyes.
 Poorna, the illegitimate grand-daughter of Shankara, unifies all of his teaching in the Upadesasahasri.
 The excommunication of the later pope Formosus is lifted, after he has promised never to return to Rome.

Births 
 Bardas Phokas (the Elder), Byzantine general (d. 968)
 Ermentrude, daughter of Louis the Stammerer (or 875)
 Krishna II, king of Rashtrakuta (India) (d. 914)
 Miró II, Frankish nobleman (approximate date)
 Odo of Cluny, Frankish abbot (approximate date)

Deaths 

 Abu Zur'a al-Razi, Muslim scholar
 Áed I, king of Alba (Scotland)
 Adelchis, prince of Benevento
 Amoghavarsha I, king of Rashtrakuta (b. 800)
 Anastasius, antipope of Rome (approximate date)
 Gauzfrid, Frankish nobleman
 Iljko, duke (knyaz) of Croatia 
 Rhodri the Great, king of Wales
 Run, king of Strathclyde (approximate date)
 Ubba Ragnarsson, Viking chieftain
 Wang Xianzhi, Chinese rebel leader

References